Waddinxveen is a railway station in Waddinxveen, Netherlands. The station opened on 7 October 1934 and is on the Gouda–Alphen aan den Rijn railway. The train services are operated by Nederlandse Spoorwegen.

Train services
The following train services call at Waddinxveen:
4x per hour local service (sprinter) Alphen aan den Rijn - Gouda (2x per hour in evenings & weekends)

Bus services
 175 (Rotterdam Alexander - Rotterdam Nesselande - Waddinxveen - Waddinxveen Noord)

External links
NS website 
Dutch Public Transport journey planner 

Railway stations in South Holland
Railway stations opened in 1934
1934 establishments in the Netherlands
Waddinxveen
Railway stations in the Netherlands opened in the 20th century